Mohamed Soussi (born 17 January 1993) is a Tunisian handball player for Montpellier Handball and the Tunisian national team.

He participated on the Tunisia national team at the 2016 Summer Olympics in Rio de Janeiro, in the men's handball tournament.

References

External links

1993 births
Living people
Tunisian male handball players
Olympic handball players of Tunisia
Handball players at the 2016 Summer Olympics
People from Nabeul
Expatriate handball players
Tunisian expatriate sportspeople in France
Montpellier Handball players
Competitors at the 2018 Mediterranean Games
Mediterranean Games silver medalists for Tunisia
Mediterranean Games medalists in handball